New Cumberland is a borough in easternmost Cumberland County, Pennsylvania, United States. New Cumberland was incorporated on March 21, 1831. The population was 7,277 at the 2010 census. The borough is noted for its historic downtown which includes landmarks like the historic West Shore Theater and the yearly Apple Festival, which gathers hundreds of vendors and thousands of visitors.

New Cumberland is part of the Harrisburg–Carlisle metropolitan statistical area.

Geography
New Cumberland is located at  (40.229140, -76.873992) and borders the western bank of the Susquehanna River in South Central Pennsylvania. It is bordered to the south by Yellow Breeches Creek, across which is York County and the Capital City Airport. To the west is Lower Allen Township, and to the north is the borough of Lemoyne. New Cumberland is situated along the southern edge of the Cumberland Valley.

Interstate 83 follows the western border of the borough, with access from Exit 40B (Simpson Ferry Road).

Demographics

As of the census of 2000, there were 7,349 people, 3,301 households, and 2,016 families residing in the borough. The racial makeup of the borough was 97.20% White, 0.64% African American, 0.10% Native American, 0.72% Asian, 0.05% Pacific Islander, 0.41% from other races, and 0.88% from two or more races. Hispanic or Latino of any race were 1.13% of the population.

There were 3,301 households, out of which 25.7% had children under the age of 18 living with them, 49.0% were married couples living together, 9.1% had a female householder with no husband present, and 38.9% were non-families. 33.0% of all households were made up of individuals, and 12.0% had someone living alone who was 65 years of age or older. The average household size was 2.22 and the average family size was 2.84.

In the borough the population was spread out, with 21.2% under the age of 18, 6.5% from 18 to 24, 30.1% from 25 to 44, 23.4% from 45 to 64, and 18.8% who were 65 years of age or older. The median age was 40 years. For every 100 females, there were 92.7 males. For every 100 females age 18 and over, there were 89.3 males.

The median income for a household in the borough was $44,783, and the median income for a family was $56,138. Males had a median income of $38,438 versus $27,964 for females. The per capita income for the borough was $24,672. About 2.6% of families and 3.6% of the population were below the poverty line, including 4.3% of those under age 18 and 2.7% of those age 65 or over.

Notable people
 Patrick Fabian (born 1964), actor
 Stephen Zack (born 1992), basketball player

References

External links

Borough of New Cumberland official website
New Cumberland community & visitors website

Pennsylvania populated places on the Susquehanna River
Populated places established in 1814
Boroughs in Cumberland County, Pennsylvania